Mutt & Stuff is an American children's television series that aired on Nick Jr. The series premiered on March 6, 2015, with an hour-long pilot and began airing regularly on July 10, 2015. It was created by Sid and Marty Krofft (in their first new product in over a decade) and Bradley Zweig. It stars Calvin Millan, the son of the series' producer Cesar Millan.

Plot
Starring Calvin Millan, son of "The Dog Whisperer" Cesar Millan, and his larger than life yellow dog named Stuff. The series follows the duo and their day-to-day activities at Mutt & Stuff, a wacky and whimsical school just for dogs.

Characters

Main 
 Calvin (portrayed by Calvin Millan) – The dog school's teenage teacher.
 Stuff (performed by Meegan Godfrey, face-performed and voiced by Drew Massey) (Nick Mercer in UK) – Calvin's giant stuffed dog and best friend. In the double-length special "H.R. Pufnstuf Comes to Mutt & Stuff," it is revealed that his uncle is the title character of the Kroffts' earlier series H.R. Pufnstuf. He is very similar in appearance to Pufnstuf as well.
 Zoe and Davenport (performed by Donna Kimball and Drew Massey) – Two cats who comment on the action from a tree outside the dog school where they often exchange jokes, similar to the characters of Statler and Waldorf from The Muppet Show. They have a tendency to fall out of their tree while laughing at their own jokes while stating that they are OK. They also wear glasses.
 Zippy (performed by Jumpy) – Calvin's pet dog.
 Cesar (portrayed by Cesar Millan) – Calvin's father.
 Melvin (performed by Victor Yerrid) – A red, talking fire hydrant that is outside the dog school, and tells jokes.
 Grandma (performed by Kuma von Clifford) – The dog in charge of the puppies while Calvin and Stuff are with the adult dogs.
 Bow Wow (voiced by Victor Yerrid) – The automated A.I. of the Bow Wow Chow Snack Machine that appears in later episodes.
 Marty and Sid (performed by Drew Massey and Victor Yerrid) – Two talking trees that were a gift from Stuff's uncle H.R. Pufnstuf that live on the playground. They are named after the show's creators, Sid & Marty Krofft.
 Noodles (performed by Donna Kimball) – A mouse who lives in the wall next to the puppy tunnel; he loves to play jokes by pulling a rope and having confetti fall all over.
 Junior Shades – A small dog who wears sunglasses. He appears in the episode "Dogs on a Plane" as co-captain with Zippy. He appears again in "Sherdog Bones" as a student at Mutt and Stuff.

Others 
 Clover (portrayed by Mila Brener) – Cuddles' owner.
 Owen – (portrayed by Aiden Lewandowski) – Sunny's owner.
 Luke (portrayed by Oskar Jacobs) – Dude's owner.
 Dr. Christina (portrayed by Kristina Krofft) – The dogs' veterinarian.
 Popcorn Vendor (portrayed by Omar von Muller) that appears at the end of the episodes handing out popcorn to people and zippy jumping into him losing his popcorn 
Annie the Animal Rescuer who guest stars and later becomes a recurring character in season two (portrayed by Rachel Eggleston) An animal rescuer who befriends Stuff and the dogs.

Guests 
 Marco (portrayed by Ashton Arbab) – Calvin's cousin.
 Gabby Groomer (portrayed by Raini Rodriguez) - the dog school's dog groomer and she appears in 6 episodes, "Skate Doggin", Gabi's Groom-A-Thon, "The Wag 4 Rock Concert", "The Happy Hallowoof Party", "H.R. Pufnstuf's Happy Tree Jamboree", and "Surprise Birthday Balloon Bash".
Sergio Style (portrayed by Rico Rodriguez) Gabi Groomer's Brother appeared in the episode, "Surprise Birthday Balloon Bash".
H.R. Pufnstuf (face performed by Donna Kimball, performed by Mary Karcz, voiced by Randy Credico) – Stuff's uncle who is from Living Island in the Krofft Series H.R. Pufnstuf.
 Freddy the Flute (performed by Donna Kimball) – H.R. Pufnstuf's magic talking flute.
 Cling and Clang (performed by Arturo Gil and Joseph S. Griffo) – H.R. Pufnstuf's Rescue Racer Crew. Like in the original series, they never speak.
 Olive – A skunk that appears in the episode "Bring In Da Noise, Bring In Da Skunk." All the dogs were scared of her and they wouldn't get along. After Noodles disguised Olive, the dogs got along with Shirley (Olive in disguise). While Calvin and the dogs were dancing, Olive's dress fell off. All the dogs were scared, and Calvin got confused. The dogs did a nose-to-nose with Calvin, then they were not scared of Olive anymore, and they found out that they could keep her.
 Wally Whiskers – A comedian that appears in the episode, "Sit Stay, Stand Up".
 Meow Meow Kitty (portrayed by Jon Heder) –  A villainous cat who takes over Mutt and Stuff, played by Jon Heder in season 2.
Simone Biles - appears as herself in season 2, helping the dogs compete and win a gymnastics competition.
Johnny in Charge (portrayed by Samm Levine) - appears in multiple episodes, typically managing an event or attraction that the dogs visit.
Enchanted Irving (portrayed by Josh Sussman) - is a magician that visits Mutt & Stuff.

Episodes

Series overview

Season 1 (2015–17)

Season 2 (2016–17)

Awards
2016: Mutt & Stuff was nominated for two Daytime Emmy Awards for Outstanding Pre-School Children's Series and Outstanding Directing in a Children's or Preschool Children's Series

References

External links
Mutt & Stuff on NickJr.com

2010s American children's television series
2010s Nickelodeon original programming
2010s preschool education television series
2015 American television series debuts
2017 American television series endings
American preschool education television series
American television shows featuring puppetry
English-language television shows
Nick Jr. original programming
Television series by Sid and Marty Krofft Television Productions
Television shows about dogs
Television series about teenagers